The 1980 Thayer Tutt Trophy was the first edition of the Thayer Tutt Trophy. It was held from March 8–16, 1980 in Ljubljana, Yugoslavia (present-day Slovenia). Switzerland finished first, East Germany finished second, and Yugoslavia finished third.

First round

Group A

Group B

Final round

Championship round
(games against previous opponents carried over from first round)

Placing round
(games against previous opponents carried over from first round)

References

External links
 Tournament on hockeyarchives.info

Thayer Tutt Trophy
1980 in ice hockey
1979–80 in Yugoslav ice hockey
1979
1979
March 1980 sports events in Europe
Sports competitions in Ljubljana
1980 in Slovenia
1980s in Ljubljana